John Fitling (died 1434), of Kingston upon Hull, Yorkshire, was an English politician and merchant.

Career
Fitling was a merchant, selling cloth, wine, wool and skins.

He was a Member (MP) of the Parliament of England for Kingston upon Hull in 1406, 1407, 1411, May 1413, 1419, May 1421, 1422, 1423, 1425, 1427 and 1431.

References

14th-century births
1434 deaths
English MPs 1406
English MPs 1407
15th-century English businesspeople
Politicians from Kingston upon Hull
English MPs 1411
English MPs May 1413
English MPs 1419
English MPs May 1421
English MPs 1422
English MPs 1423
English MPs 1425
English MPs 1427
English MPs 1431